The 1978 Sugar Bowl  was the 44th edition of the college football bowl game, played at the Louisiana Superdome in New Orleans, Louisiana, on Monday, January 2. Part of the 1977–78 bowl game season, it matched the third-ranked Alabama Crimson Tide of the Southeastern Conference (SEC) and the #9 Ohio State Buckeyes of the Big Ten Conference.

The teams were led by their respective hall of fame head coaches,  and  who were the winningest active coaches. Slightly  Alabama won in 

New Year's Day was on Sunday in 1978, and the major college bowl games were played the following day.

Teams

Alabama

Alabama finished the regular season as SEC champions with a record of  the only loss was at Nebraska  in week two. On November 19, bowl officials announced that Alabama would face Ohio State in the Sugar Bowl. The appearance marked the eighth for Alabama in the Sugar Bowl, and their 31st overall bowl appearance. It was the Tide's second game against a Big Ten opponent, the first was at Wisconsin in the 1928 regular season.

Ohio State

Ohio State finished the regular season as co-champions of the Big Ten with a record of  Their only defeats were to Oklahoma by a point  on a disputed late field goal in week three and at rival Michigan Wolverines  to close the regular season. On November 19, bowl officials announced that Michigan would play in the Rose Bowl and that Ohio State would face Alabama in the Sugar Bowl.

The appearance marked the first for Ohio State in the Sugar Bowl, and their 12th overall bowl appearance.  It was the Buckeyes' first game against an SEC team  when they defeated Kentucky in the season opener.

Game summary
The game kicked off at around 1 pm CST, as did the Cotton Bowl.

After a scoreless first quarter, Alabama scored on a one-yard Tony Nathan touchdown run to cap a 10-play, 76-yard drive. On their next offensive possession, Bama scored again on a 27-yard Jeff Rutledge touchdown pass to Bruce Bolton to take a 13–0 lead at the half.

In the third quarter, Rutledge had his second touchdown on a 3-yard pass to Rick Neal. Following a successful two-point conversion pass to Nathan, Alabama led 21–0, the score at the quarter's end. The Buckeyes scored their only points of the game early in the fourth when Rod Gerald threw a 38-yard touchdown pass to Jim Harrell, but failed on the two-point try and the score was 21–6. Bama closed the game with a pair of touchdown runs, the first from one yard by Major Ogilvie, and the second by Johnny Davis on a seven-yard run to make the final score 35–6.

Statistics
{| class=wikitable style="text-align:center"
! Statistics !!   Alabama   !! Ohio State
|-
|First downs || 25|| 13
|-
|Rushing yards|| 68–280|| 38–160
|-
|Passing yards|| 109|| 103
|-
|Passing ||8–11–0 ||7–17–3
|-
|Total offense || 79–389|| 55–263
|-
|Punts–average ||1–33.0|| 4–37.5
|-
|Fumbles–lost ||0–0|| 10–2
|-
|Turnovers|| 0 || 5
|-
|Penalties–yards ||1–5|| 4–40
|}

Aftermath
While #3 Alabama won easily, top-ranked Texas and #2 Oklahoma were both upset by large margins in their bowl games. Fifth-ranked Notre Dame's  rout of #1 Texas in the  gained them the top spot in both final polls; Alabama was the runner-up and Orange Bowl winner Arkansas was third.

Alabama returned to the Sugar Bowl the following year and won the national championship.

This was the final major bowl game for Woody Hayes; Ohio State played in the Gator Bowl in December 1978, his last game as head coach.

References

Sugar Bowl
Sugar Bowl
Alabama Crimson Tide football bowl games
Ohio State Buckeyes football bowl games
Sugar Bowl
Sugar Bowl